Living with the Dead is a British television programme about a team of paranormal investigators who investigate ghostly goings on and supernatural occurrences in family homes around Britain. The team aim to resolve the paranormal activity for the family concerned. While mainly focused on ordinary family homes, investigations in celebrity homes such as comedian Freddie Starr's occasionally feature.

Each run comprises 8 sixty-minute episodes. Now into its second series, the show airs on the Virgin Media Television satellite channel Living, plus Australian and Canadian channels.

Team
The team consists of American-born medium Johnnie Fiori, exorcist & psychic Medium Ian Lawman, historian Hallie Rubenhold and paranormal researcher Stephen Griffiths; who work together with the families living in allegedly haunted homes to remove the evil and terrifying spirits that plague them.

Each team member has a distinct role.
Johnnie Fiori's is to assess the paranormal activity as well as spending the night at the home. In his role to resolve the issues, Ian Lawman draws on a range on methods including séances. Historian Hallie Rubenhold, explores local history surrounding the house to uncover any macabre events that may lie behind the hauntings. Fiori cites the investigation at Saddleworth as a favourite, while Lawman cites the one at Blackpool as particularly enthralling.

Production
In July 2009, series one investigator Mark Webb published e-mails on his website, in a post questioning the authenticity of the programme's mediums Lawman and Fiori with claims they were given full information several days before filming took place.

For series two, Mark Webb was replaced by investigator Stephen Griffiths who had previously assisted with research and made an appearance in series one (The Ghost in the Attic).

Original Productions UK, the London arm of Los Angeles-based Original Productions, produce the series.  Each episode is sixty minutes. The series premiered with an eight-part run, in the first quarter of 2008. It received sufficiently warm reception that a second series was commissioned, broadcast from April 2009. Through syndication, it began airing in April 2009 on Australia's CI channel. From October 2009, the series also airs in Canada on CTV.

Seasons 1&2

References

Sky Living original programming
Paranormal television
2008 British television series debuts
2009 British television series endings